Tai Wu or Da Wu, personal name Zi Mi, was a Shang dynasty King of China.  Records of the Grand Historian he was listed by Sima Qian as the ninth Shang king, succeeding his brother Yong Ji. He was enthroned with Bo as his capital. He appointed Yishe and Chenhu as his higher officers.
 
On the 7th year of his reign a mulberry tree and millet were found growing together in his palace. According to the Records of the Grand Historian, surprisingly, they grew to very tall trees within 7 days. This young king was quite scared and turned to Yishe for explanation, which was in regard to the king's former incapable governance. Tai Wu listen to his intelligent ministers and worked diligently; then, those two unusual trees withered very soon after he became a good king.

In the 11th year of his reign, he ordered Wu Xian to pray at Shanchuan. In the 26th year of his reign, the Queen of West Rong sent an envoy to Shang, the king later sent Wangmeng on a return visit. In the 31st year of his reign, he appointed Zhongyan of Fei vassal to the position of Chezheng. In the 35th year of his reign, he wrote a poem called Yanche ("Tiger chariot" or "To revere the chariot"). In the 46th year of his reign, there was a great harvest of crops. In the 58th year of his reign, he built the city of Pugu. In the 61st year of his reign, the nine east Barbarians Yi tribes sent envoys to Shang.

He ruled for 75 years, was given the posthumous name Tai Wu and was succeeded by his son Zhong Ding.

Oracle script inscriptions on bones unearthed at Yinxu alternatively record that he was the seventh Shang king succeeding his uncle Xiao Jia, given the posthumous name Da Wu and succeeded by his brother Lü Ji.

References

Shang dynasty kings